10 Delphini (10 Del) is a solitary star in the equatorial constellation Delphinus. It has an apparent magnitude of 6.00, allowing it to be faintly seen with the naked eye.

10 Delphini has a stellar classification of K4 III or K2 III, both indicating that it is a red giant. However, there is some uncertainty behind the first classification. It has twice the mass of the Sun but at an age of 794 million years — expanded to 18 times the radius of the Sun.

10 Del has been suspected to be a variable star, although it hasn't been catalogued as such in the GCVS.

References

Delphinus (constellation)
K-type giants
197121
102080
7918
+14 4393
Delphini, 10